Jessica Holbrook (born 1 August 1992) is a former youth England women's international footballer. Holbrook has played for Manchester City and Liverpool in the Women's Super League.

International career

Holbrook represented England at the 2008 FIFA U-17 Women's World Cup.

Honours

England
UEFA Women's Under-19 Championship: 2009

Liverpool Ladies
 WSL Women's Super League : 2013

References

External links

1992 births

Living people
Women's association football midfielders
Liverpool F.C. Women players
Manchester City W.F.C. players
Women's Super League players
English women's footballers
Blackburn Rovers L.F.C. players
Fylde Ladies F.C. players
Everton F.C. (women) players
Leeds City Vixens L.F.C. players
Leeds United Women F.C. players
England women's youth international footballers
Footballers from Manchester